Amphitornus is a genus of slant-faced grasshoppers in the family Acrididae. There are at least two described species in Amphitornus.

Species
These two species belong to the genus Amphitornus:
 Amphitornus coloradus (Thomas, 1873) (striped slant-face grasshopper)
 Amphitornus durangus Otte, 1979

References

Further reading

 
 
 

Acrididae genera
Articles created by Qbugbot
Gomphocerinae